Lervik is a Norwegian surname. Notable people with the surname include:

Andreas M. Lervik (born 1969), Norwegian politician
Åse Hiorth Lervik (1933–1997), Norwegian literary researcher
John Markus Lervik (born 1969), Norwegian businessman
Lars Lervik (born 1971), Norwegian army officer

Norwegian-language surnames